Isumrud Strait is the strait separating Karkar Island from mainland New Guinea in Madang Province, Papua New Guinea. It's 500 km from Port Moresby.

See also
Isumrud Strait languages

References 

Straits of Papua New Guinea